The Oman Investment Fund is a sovereign wealth fund, established in 2006 in accordance with a royal decree of His Majesty the Sultan of Oman. The fund makes medium to long-term investments, globally and domestically, to diversify the government of Oman's asset base and create a pool of sustainable cash flow.  Currently, the fund's assets under management are estimated at approximately US$18 billion.

History
The Oman Investment Fund was established in 2006 and was the successor to the Oman Oil Fund, which was formed in 1993 to invest in the domestic oil industry.  The fund received an additional US$1 billion from the Omani government expanding its assets under management.

Strategy and objectives
The fund is legally prohibited from publicly disclosing information about its investment strategy or asset allocation. It is therefore only possible to estimate its funds under management, and a full list of its investments is not publicly available.

The fund has a long-term investment horizon, and its mandate includes seeking above-average returns. Its primary objective upon its establishment was to generate economic growth in the Sultanate of Oman, through direct investment in domestic companies, by assisting foreign companies to extend their investments and operations in Oman, or by facilitating knowledge and technological transfer to domestic entities.

The fund has made investments in real estate and private equity. Other investment sectors in which it has historically invested include:
Travel and leisure
Media and entertainment
Industrial goods and services
Industrial transportation and engineering
Financial services
Utilities
Telecom infrastructure

Given the Oman Investment Fund's imperative to generate above average-returns through long-term investments, it has shown a particular interest in emerging industries within Oman, as well as markets with promising growth potential. It has shown a preference for high-growth emerging markets, such as India, where Oman has historical trading ties.

Governance
The fund's sole shareholder is the Government of the Sultanate of Oman. It is overseen by Financial Affairs and Energy Resources Council and the Ministry of Finance of Oman.

References

Companies of Oman
Sovereign wealth funds